There are almost 500 known compositions by Heinrich Schütz. Listed here are most of his compositions in the order of the SWV (Schütz-Werke-Verzeichnis) catalog.

Choral works

Italian Madrigals
Opus 1: Venice (1614) 5 voices

 SWV 001 — O primavera
 SWV 002 — O dolcezze amarissime
 SWV 003 — Selve beate
 SWV 004 — Alma afflitta
 SWV 005 — Così morir debb'io
 SWV 006 — D'orrida selce alpina
 SWV 007 — Ride la primavera
 SWV 008 — Fuggi o mio core
 SWV 009 — Feritevi, ferite
 SWV 010 — Flamma ch'allacia
 SWV 011 — Quella damma son io
 SWV 012 — Mi saluta costei
 SWV 013 — Io moro, eccho ch'io moro
 SWV 014 — Sospir che del bel petto
 SWV 015 — Dunque addio
 SWV 016 — Tornate, o cari baci
 SWV 017 — Di marmo siete voi
 SWV 018 — Giunto è pur, Lidia
 SWV 019 — Vasto mar - dedicatory madrigal to Moritz, Landgrave of Hesse, for 8 voices

Wedding concerts
 SWV 020 — Wohl dem, der ein tugendsam Weib hat, for wedding of Joseph Avenarius and Anna Dorothea Görlitz, Dresden, 21 April 1618.
 SWV 021 — Haus und Güter erbet man von Eltern, for wedding of Michael Thomas and Anna Schultes, Leipzig, 15 June 1618.

Psalmen Davids 

German settings of the Psalms of David (Book 1)

Opus 2: Dresden (1619)

 SWV 022 — Der Herr sprach zu meinem Herren (Psalm 110)
 SWV 023 — Warum toben die Heiden (Psalm 2)
 SWV 024 — Ach, Herr, straf mich nicht (Psalm 6)
 SWV 025 — Aus der Tiefe (Psalm 130)
 SWV 026 — Ich freu mich des (Psalm 122)
 SWV 027 — Herr, unser Herrscher (Psalm 8)
 SWV 028 — Wohl dem, der nicht wandelt (Psalm 1)
 SWV 029 — Wie lieblich sind deine Wohnungen (Psalm 84)
 SWV 030 — Wohl dem, der den Herren fürchtet (Psalm 128)
 SWV 031 — Ich hebe meine Augen auf (Psalm 121)
 SWV 032 — Danket dem Herren, denn er ist freundlich (Psalm 136)
 SWV 033 — Der Herr ist mein Hirt (Psalm 23)
 SWV 034 — Ich danke dem Herrn (Psalm 111)
 SWV 035 — Singet dem Herrn ein neues Lied (Psalm 98)
 SWV 036 — Jauchzet dem Herren, alle Welt (Psalm 100)
 SWV 037 — An den Wassern zu Babel (Psalm 137)
 SWV 038 — Alleluja! Lobet den Herren (Psalm 150)
 SWV 039 — Lobe den Herren, meine Seele (Concert)
 SWV 040 — Ist nicht Ephraim mein teurer Sohn (Motet)
 SWV 041 — Nun lob, mein Seel, den Herren (Canzon) on Johann Gramann's hymn
 SWV 042 — Die mit Tränen säen (Motet)
 SWV 043 — Nicht uns, Herr (Psalm 115)
 SWV 044 — Wohl dem, der den Herren fürchtet (Psalm 128)
 SWV 045 — Danket dem Herren, denn er ist freundlich (Psalm 136)
 SWV 046 — Zion spricht, der Herr hat mich verlassen (Concert)
 SWV 047 — Jauchzet dem Herren, alle Welt (Concert)

Psalm 133 (1619)
 SWV 048 — Siehe, wie fein und lieblich ist's

Syncharma musicum
Breslau 1621
 SWV 049 — En novus Elysiis - ceremonial motet for the oaths of allegiance of the Silesian nobility to Johann Georg of Saxony as the representative of Emperor Ferdinand (Breslau 1621).

Die Auferstehung unsres Herren Jesu Christi
Opus 3: Dresden (1623)

 SWV 050 — Historia der Auferstehung Jesu Christi (Resurrection Story)

Psalm 116 (1619)
One of sixteen composers who composed a setting of Das ist mir lieb (Psalm 116) for Angst der Hellen und Friede der Seelen, commissioned in 1616 by Burckhard Grossmann of Jena, published in 1623.
 SWV 051 — Das ist mir lieb

Grimmige Gruft (1622/3)
 SWV 052 - Kläglicher Abschied von der Churfürstlichen Grufft zu Freybergk - text by Schütz, on the death of Duchess Sophie of Brandenburg, 7 Dec 1622, mother of John George I, Elector of Saxony.

Cantiones sacrae 

Opus 4: Freiberg (1625)

 SWV 053 — O bone, o dulcis, o benigne Jesu
 SWV 054 — Et ne despicias humiliter te petentem
 SWV 055 — Deus misereatur nostri, et benedicat nobis
 SWV 056 — Quid commisisti, o dulcissime puer?
 SWV 057 — Ego sum tui plaga doloris
 SWV 058 — Ego enim inique egi
 SWV 059 — Quo, nate Dei, quo tua descendit humilitas
 SWV 060 — Calicem salutaris accipiam
 SWV 061 — Verba mea auribus percipe, Domine
 SWV 062 — Quoniam ad te clamabo, Domine
 SWV 063 — Ego dormio, et cor meum vigilat
 SWV 064 — Vulnerasti cor meum, filia charissima
 SWV 065 — Heu mihi, Domine, quia peccavi nimis
 SWV 066 — In te, Domine, speravi
 SWV 067 — Dulcissime et benignissime Christe
 SWV 068 — Sicut Moses serpentem in deserto exaltabit
 SWV 069 — Spes mea, Christe Deus, hominum tu dolcis amator
 SWV 070 — Turbabor, sed non pertubabor
 SWV 071 — Ad Dominum cum tribularer clamavi
 SWV 072 — Quid detur tibi aut quid apponatur tibi
 SWV 073 — Aspice pater piissimum filium
 SWV 074 — Nonne hic est, mi Domine, innocens ille
 SWV 075 — Reduc, Domine Deus meus, oculos majestatis
 SWV 076 — Supereminet omnem scientiam, o bone Jesu
 SWV 077 — Pro hoc magno mysterio pietatis
 SWV 078 — Domine, non est exaltatum cor meum
 SWV 079 — Si non humiliter sentiebam
 SWV 080 — Speret Israel in Domino
 SWV 081 — Cantate Domino canticum novum
 SWV 082 — Inter brachia Salvatoris mei
 SWV 083 — Veni, rogo in cor meum
 SWV 084 — Ecce advocatus meus apud te, Deum patrem
 SWV 085 — Domine, ne in furore tuo arguas me
 SWV 086 — Quoniam non est in morte qui memor sit tui
 SWV 087 — Discedite a me omnes qui operamini
 SWV 088 — Oculi omnium in te sperant, Domine
 SWV 089 — Pater noster, qui es in cœlis
 SWV 090 — Domine Deus, pater cœlestis, benedic nobis
 SWV 091 — Confitemini Domino, quoniam ipse bonus
 SWV 092 — Pater noster: Repetatur ut supra
 SWV 093 — Gratias agimus tibi, Domine Deus Pater

Aria: De vitae fugacitate (1625)
 SWV 094 — De vitae fugacitate "Ich hab mein Sach Gott heimgestellt" - on the death of Schütz' sister in law Anna Maria Wildeck, three weeks before the death of Schütz' wife Magdalena herself after 6 years of marriage.

Last words of Psalm 23 (1625)
SWV 095 — Ultima verba psalmi 23 - "Gutes und Barmherzigkeit" (Psalm 23; 1625), on the death of student Jakob Schultes, brother of the wife in the wedding motet SWV21.

Glück zu dem Helikon (1627)
 SWV 096 — Glück zu dem Helikon - for the graduation of Johann Nauwach

Becker Psalter 

Psalmen Davids: Hiebevorn in Teutzsche Reimen gebracht durch D. Cornelium Beckern, Opus 5: Freiberg (1628), revised Dresden (1661)

 SWV 097 — Wer nicht sitzt im Gottlosen Rat (Psalm 1)
 SWV 098 — Was haben doch die Leut im Sinn (Psalm 2)
 SWV 099 — Ach wie groß ist der Feinde Rott (Psalm 3)
 SWV 100 — Erhör mich, wenn ich ruf zu dir (Psalm 4)
 SWV 101 — Herr, hör, was ich will bitten dich (Psalm 5)
 SWV 102 — Ach Herr mein Gott, straf mich doch nicht (Psalm 6)
 SWV 103 — Auf dich trau ich, mein Herr und Gott (Psalm 7)
 SWV 104 — Mit Dank wir sollen loben (Psalm 8)
 SWV 105 — Mit fröhlichem Gemüte (Psalm 9)
 SWV 106 — Wie meinst du's doch, ach Herr, mein Gott (Psalm 10)
 SWV 107 — Ich trau auf Gott, was soll's denn sein (Psalm 11)
 SWV 108 — Ach Gott, von Himmel sieh darein (Psalm 12)
 SWV 109 — Ach Herr, wie lang willst du denn noch (Psalm 13)
 SWV 110 — Es spricht der Unweisen Mund wohl (Psalm 14)
 SWV 111 — Wer wird, Herr, in der Hütten dein (Psalm 15)
 SWV 112 — Bewahr mich, Gott, ich trau auf dich (Psalm 16)
 SWV 113 — Herr Gott, erhör die Grechtigkeit (Psalm 17)
 SWV 114 — Ich lieb dich, Herr, von Herzen sehr (Psalm 18)
 SWV 115 — Die Himmel, Herr, preisen Dein göttliche Macht und Ehr (Psalm 19)
 SWV 116 — Der Herr erhört dich in der Not (Psalm 20)
 SWV 117 — Hoch freuet sich der König (Psalm 21)
 SWV 118 — Mein Gott, mein Gott, ach Herr, mein Gott (Psalm 22, 1st Part)
 SWV 119 — Ich will verkündgen in der Gmein (Psalm 22, 2nd Part)
 SWV 120 — Der Herr ist mein getreuer Hirt (Psalm 23)
 SWV 121 — Die Erd und was sich auf ihr regt (Psalm 24)
 SWV 122 — Nach dir verlangt mich (Psalm 25)
 SWV 123 — Herr, schaff mir Recht, nimm dich mein an (Psalm 26)
 SWV 124 — Mein Licht und Heil ist Gott der Herr (Psalm 27)
 SWV 125 — Ich ruf zu dir, Herr Gott, mein Hort (Psalm 28)
 SWV 126 — Bring Ehr und Preis dem Herren (Psalm 29)
 SWV 127 — Ich preis dich, Herr, zu aller Stund (Psalm 30)
 SWV 128 — In dich hab ich gehoffet, Herr (Psalm 31)
 SWV 129 — Der Mensch vor Gott wohl selig ist (Psalm 32)
 SWV 130 — Freut euch des Herrn, ihr Christen all (Psalm 33)
 SWV 131 — Ich will bei meinem Leben rühmen den Herren mein (Psalm 34)
 SWV 132 — Herr, hader mit den Hadrern mein (Psalm 35)
 SWV 133 — Ich sag's von Grund meins Herzens frei (Psalm 36)
 SWV 134 — Erzürn dich nicht so sehre (Psalm 37)
 SWV 135 — Herr, straf mich nicht in deinem Zorn (Psalm 38)
 SWV 136 — In meinem Herzen hab ich mir (Psalm 39)
 SWV 137 — Ich harrete des Herren (Psalm 40)
 SWV 138 — Wohl mag der sein ein selig Mann (Psalm 41)
 SWV 139 — Gleich wie ein Hirsch eilt mit Begier (Psalm 42)
 SWV 140 — Gott, führ mein Sach und richte mich (Psalm 43)
 SWV 141 — Wir haben, Herr, mit Fleiß gehört (Psalm 44)
 SWV 142 — Mein Herz dichtet ein Lied mit Fleiß (Psalm 45)
 SWV 143 — Ein feste Burg ist unser Gott (Psalm 46)
 SWV 144 — Frohlockt mit Freud, ihr Völker all (Psalm 47)
 SWV 145 — Groß ist der Herr und hoch gepreist (Psalm 48)
 SWV 146 — Hört zu ihr Völker in gemein (Psalm 49)
 SWV 147 — Gott unser Herr, mächtig durchs Wort (Psalm 50)
 SWV 148 — Erbarm dich mein, o Herre Gott (Psalm 51)
 SWV 149 — Was trotzst denn du, Tyrann, so hoch (Psalm 52)
 SWV 150 — Es spricht der Unweisen Mund wohl (Psalm 53)
 SWV 151 — Hilf mir, Gott, durch den Namen dein (Psalm 54)
 SWV 152 — Erhör mein Gebet, du treuer Gott (Psalm 55)
 SWV 153 — Herr Gott, erzeig mir Hülf und Gnad (Psalm 56)
 SWV 154 — Sei mir gnädig, o Gott, mein Herr (Psalm 57)
 SWV 155 — Wie nun, ihr Herren, seid ihr stumm (Psalm 58)
 SWV 156 — Hilf, Herre Gott, errette mich (Psalm 59)
 SWV 157 — Ach Gott, der du vor dieser Zeit (Psalm 60)
 SWV 158 — Gott, mein Geschrei erhöre (Psalm 61)
 SWV 159 — Mein Seel ist still in meinem Gott (Psalm 62)
 SWV 160 — O Gott, du mein getreuer Gott (Psalm 63)
 SWV 161 — Erhör mein Stimm, Herr, wenn ich klag (Psalm 64)
 SWV 162 — Gott, man lobt dich in der Still (Psalm 65)
 SWV 163 — Jauchzet Gott, alle Lande sehr (Psalm 66)
 SWV 164 — Es woll uns Gott genädig sein (Psalm 67), paraphrased in a hymn by Martin Luther
 SWV 165 — Es steh Gott auf, daß seine Feind (Psalm 68)
 SWV 166 — Gott hilf mir, denn das Wasser dringt (Psalm 69)
 SWV 167 — Eil, Herr mein Gott, zu retten mich (Psalm 70)
 SWV 168 — Auf dich, Herr, trau ich alle Zeit (Psalm 71)
 SWV 169 — Gott, gib dem König auserkorn (Psalm 72)
 SWV 170 — Dennoch hat Israel zum Trost (Psalm 73)
 SWV 171 — Warum verstößt du uns so gar (Psalm 74)
 SWV 172 — Aus unsers Herzen Grunde (Psalm 75)
 SWV 173 — In Juda ist der Herr bekannt (Psalm 76)
 SWV 174 — Ich ruf zu Gott mit meiner Stimm (Psalm 77)
 SWV 175 — Hör, mein Volk, mein Gesetz und Weis (Psalm 78)
 SWV 176 — Ach Herr, es ist der Heiden Herr (Psalm 79)
 SWV 177 — Du Hirt Israel, höre uns (Psalm 80)
 SWV 178 — Singet mit Freuden unserm Gott (Psalm 81)
 SWV 179 — Merkt auf, die ihr an Gottes Statt (Psalm 82)
 SWV 180 — Gott, schweig du nicht so ganz und gar (Psalm 83)
 SWV 181 — Wie sehr lieblich und schöne sind doch die Wohnung dein (Psalm 84)
 SWV 182 — Herr, der du vormals gnädig warst (Psalm 85)
 SWV 183 — Herr, neig zu mir dein gnädigs Ohr (Psalm 86)
 SWV 184 — Fest ist gegründet Gottes Stadt (Psalm 87)
 SWV 185 — Herr Gott, mein Heiland, Nacht und Tag (Psalm 88)
 SWV 186 — Ich will von Gnade singen (Psalm 89, 1st Part)
 SWV 187 — Ach Gott, warum verstößt du nun (Psalm 89, Other Part)
 SWV 188 — Herr Gott Vater im höchsten Thron (Psalm 90)
 SWV 189 — Wer sich des Höchsten Schirm vertraut (Psalm 91)
 SWV 190 — Es ist fürwahr ein köstlich Ding (Psalm 92)
 SWV 191 — Der Herr ist König herrlich schön (Psalm 93)
 SWV 192 — Gott, dem alle Rach heimfällt (Psalm 94)
 SWV 193 — Kommt herzu, laßt uns fröhlich sein (Psalm 95)
 SWV 194 — Singet dem Herrn ein neues Lied (Psalm 96)
 SWV 195 — Der Herr ist König überall (Psalm 97)
 SWV 196 — Singet dem Herrn ein neues Lied (Psalm 98)
 SWV 197 — Der Herr ist König und residiert (Psalm 99)
 SWV 198 — Jauchzet dem Herren, alle Welt (Psalm 100)
 SWV 199 — Von Gnad und Recht soll singen Psalm 101)
 SWV 200 — Hör mein Gebet und laß zu dir (Psalm 102)
 SWV 201 — Nun lob, mein Seel, den Herren (Psalm 103)
 SWV 202 — Herr, dich lob die Seele mein (Psalm 104)
 SWV 203 — Danket dem Herren, lobt ihn frei (Psalm 105)
 SWV 204 — Danket dem Herrn, erzeigt ihm Ehr (Psalm 106)
 SWV 205 — Danket dem Herren, unserm Gott (Psalm 107)
 SWV 206 — Mit rechtem Ernst und fröhlichm Mut (Psalm 108)
 SWV 207 — Herr Gott, deß ich mich rühmte viel (Psalm 109)
 SWV 208 — Der Herr sprach zu meim Herren (Psalm 110)
 SWV 209 — Ich will von Herzen danken Gott dem Herren (Psalm 111)
 SWV 210 — Der ist fürwahr ein selig Mann (Psalm 112)
 SWV 211 — Lobet, ihr Knecht, den Herren (Psalm 113)
 SWV 212 — Als das Volk Israel auszog (Psalm 114)
 SWV 213 — Nicht uns, nicht uns, Herr, lieber Gott (Psalm 115)
 SWV 214 — Meim Herzen ist's ein große Freud (Psalm 116)
 SWV 215 — Lobt Gott mit Schall, ihr Heiden all (Psalm 117)
 SWV 216 — Laßt uns Gott, unserm Herren (Psalm 118)
 SWV 217 — Wohl denen, die da leben (Psalm 119, Parts 1,2)
 SWV 218 — Tu wohl, Herr, deinem Knechte (Psalm 119, Parts 3,4,5)
 SWV 219 — Laß mir Gnad widerfahren (Psalm 119, Parts 6,7,8)
 SWV 220 — Du trust viel Guts beweisen (Psalm 119, Parts 9,10,11)
 SWV 221 — Dein Wort, Herr, nicht vergehet (Psalm 119, Parts 12,13,14)
 SWV 222 — Ich haß die Flattergeister (Psalm 119, Parts 15,16,17)
 SWV 223 — Dir gbührt allein die Ehre (Psalm 119, Parts 18,19,20)
 SWV 224 — Fürsten sind meine Feinde (Psalm 119, Parts 21,22)
 SWV 225 — Ich ruf zu dir, mein Herr und Gott (Psalm 120)
 SWV 226 — Ich heb mein Augen sehnlich auf (Psalm 121)
 SWV 227 — Es ist ein Freud dem Herzen mein (Psalm 122)
 SWV 228 — Ich heb mein Augen auf zu dir (Psalm 123)
 SWV 229 — Wär Gott nicht mit uns diese Zeit (Psalm 124) on Luther's hymn "Wär Gott nicht mit uns diese Zeit"
 SWV 230 — Die nur vertraulich stellen (Psalm 125)
 SWV 231 — Wenn Gott einmal erlösen wird (Psalm 126)
 SWV 232 — Wo Gott zum Haus nicht gibt sein Gunst (Psalm 127)
 SWV 233 — Wohl dem, der in Gottesfurcht steht (Psalm 128)
 SWV 234 — Die Feind haben mich oft gedrängt (Psalm 129)
 SWV 235 — Aus tiefer Not schrei ich zu dir (Psalm 130) on Luther's hymn "Aus tiefer Not schrei ich zu dir"
 SWV 236 — Herr, mein Gemüt und Sinn du weißt (Psalm 131)
 SWV 237 — In Gnaden, Herr, wollst eindenk sein (Psalm 132)
 SWV 238 — Wie ist's so fein, lieblich und schön (Psalm 133)
 SWV 239 — Den Herren lobt mit Freuden (Psalm 134)
 SWV 240 — Lobt Gott von Herzengrunde (Psalm 135)
 SWV 241 — Danket dem Herren, gebt ihn Ehr (Psalm 136)
 SWV 242 — An Wasserflüssen Babylon (Psalm 137) on Wolfgang Dachstein's "An Wasserflüssen Babylon"
 SWV 243 — Aus meines Herzens Grunde (Psalm 138)
 SWV 244 — Herr, du erforschst mein Sinne (Psalm 139)
 SWV 245 — Von bösen Menschen rette mich (Psalm 140)
 SWV 246 — Herr, mein Gott, wenn ich ruf zu dir (Psalm 141)
 SWV 247 — Ich schrei zu meinem lieben Gott (Psalm 142)
 SWV 248 — Herr, mein Gebet erhör in Gnad (Psalm 143)
 SWV 249 — Gelobet sei der Herr, mein Hort (Psalm 144)
 SWV 250 — Ich will sehr hoch erhöhen dich (Psalm 145)
 SWV 251 — Mein Seel soll loben Gott den Herrn (Psalm 146)
 SWV 252 — Zu Lob und Ehr mit Freuden singt (Psalm 147)
 SWV 253 — Lobet, ihr Himmel, Gott den Herrn (Psalm 148)
 SWV 254 — Die heilige Gemeine (Psalm 149)
 SWV 255 — Lobt Gott in seinem Heiligtum (Psalm 150)
 SWV 256 — Responsorium

Symphoniae sacrae I 
Symphoniae sacrae I, Opus 6: Venice (1629)

 SWV 257 — Paratum cor meum, Deus
 SWV 258 — Exultavit cor meum in Domino
 SWV 259 — In te, Domine, speravi
 SWV 260 — Cantabo domino in vita mea
 SWV 261 — Venite ad me omnes qui laboratis
 SWV 262 — Jubilate Deo omnis terra
 SWV 263 — Anima mea liquefacta est
 SWV 264 — Adjuro vos, filiae Jerusalem
 SWV 265 — O quam tu pulchra es, amica mea
 SWV 266 — Veni de Libano, veni, amica mea
 SWV 267 — Benedicam Dominum in omni tempore
 SWV 268 — Exquisivi Dominum et exaudivit me
 SWV 269 — Fili mi, Absalon
 SWV 270 — Attendite, popule meus
 SWV 271 — Domine, labia mea aperies
 SWV 272 — In lectulo per noctes
 SWV 273 — Invenerunt me costudes civitatis
 SWV 274 — Veni, dilecte mi, in hortum meum
 SWV 275 — Buccinate in neomenia tuba
 SWV 276 — Jubilate Deo in chordis

Funeral motet on the death of Johann Hermann Schein (1630) 

 SWV 277 — Das ist je gewißlich wahr

O der großen Wuntertaten (1633/4) 
 SWV 278 — O der großen Wuntertaten

Musikalische Exequien 

Opus 7: Dresden (1636) for the funeral of :de:Heinrich II. (Reuß-Gera)

 SWV 279 — Nacket bin ich vom Mutterleib gekommen
 SWV 280 — Herr, wenn ich nur dich habe
 SWV 281 — Herr, nun lässest du deinen Diener in Friede fahren

Erster Theil kleiner geistlichen Concerten 
Opus 8: Leipzig, 1636

 SWV 282 — Eile, mich, Gott, zu erretten, Herr, mir zu helfen
 SWV 283 — Bringt her dem Herren, ihr Gewaltigen
 SWV 284 — Ich danke dem Herrn von ganzem Herzen
 SWV 285 — O süßer, o freundlicher, o gütiger Herr Jesu Christe
 SWV 286 — Der Herr ist groß
 SWV 287 — O lieber Herre Gott
 SWV 288 — Ihr Heiligen, lobsinget dem Herren
 SWV 289 — Erhöre mich, wenn ich rufe
 SWV 290 — Wohl dem, der nicht wandelt im Rat der Gottlosen
 SWV 291 — Schaffe in mir, Gott, ein reines Herz
 SWV 292 — Der Herr schauet vom Himmel
 SWV 293 — Lobet den Herren, der zu Zion wohnet
 SWV 294 — Eins bitte ich vom Herren
 SWV 295 — O hilf, Christe, Gottes Sohn
 SWV 296 — Fürchte dich nicht
 SWV 297 — O Herr hilf
 SWV 298 — Das Blut Jesu Christi
 SWV 299 — Die Gottseligkeit
 SWV 300 — Himmel und Erde vergehen
 SWV 301 — Nun komm, der Heiden Heiland, on "Nun komm, der Heiden Heiland"
 SWV 302 — Ein Kind ist uns geboren
 SWV 303 — Wir gläuben all an einen Gott
 SWV 304 — Siehe, mein Fürsprecher ist im Himmel
 SWV 305 — Ich hab mein Sach Gott heimgestellt

Kleine Geistliche Konzerte II 
Opus 9: Leipzig, 1639
 SWV 306 — Ich will den Herren loben allezeit
 SWV 307 — Was hast du verwirket
 SWV 308 — O Jesu, nomen dulce
 SWV 309 — O misericordissime Jesu
 SWV 310 — Ich liege und schlafe
 SWV 311 — Habe deine Lust an dem Herren
 SWV 312 — Herr, ich hoffe darauf
 SWV 313 — Bone Jesu, verbum Patris
 SWV 314 — Verbum caro factum est
 SWV 315 — Hodie Christus natus est
 SWV 316 — Quando se clandunt lumina
 SWV 317 — Meister, wir haben die ganze Nacht gearbeitet
 SWV 318 — Die Furcht des Herren ist der Weisheit Anfang
 SWV 319 — Ich beuge meine Knie
 SWV 320 — Ich bin jung gewesen und bin alt worden
 SWV 321 — Herr, wenn ich nur dich habe
 SWV 322 — Rorate coeli desuper
 SWV 323 — Joseph, du Sohn David
 SWV 324 — Ich bin die Auferstehung
 SWV 325 — Die Seele Christi heilige mich
 SWV 326 — Te Christe supplex in voco
 SWV 327 — Allein Gott in der Höh sei Ehr
 SWV 328 — Veni, sancte Spiritus
 SWV 329 — Ist Gott für uns
 SWV 330 — Wer will uns scheiden von der Liebe Gottes?
 SWV 331 — Die Stimm des Herren geht auf den Wassern
 SWV 332 — Jubilate Deo omnis terra
 SWV 333 — Sei gegrüßet, Maria
 SWV 334 — Ave, Maria
 SWV 335 — Was betrübst du dich, meine Seele
 SWV 336 — Quemadmodum desiderat
 SWV 337 — Aufer immensam, Deus, aufer iram

Teutoniam dudum (1621) 
Breslau 1621, Leipzig, published 1641
 SWV 338 — Teutoniam dudum belli atra pericla molestant. Zur Huldigung der schlesischen Stände. Probably for the oath of loyalty to Johann Georg. Ceremonial text: "Omnibus o bona pax gaudia mille ferat. Laetentur cives patulo gens omnis in orbe, In Patria dulci prosperitate nova. Tota Slesis resonet, resonet jam tota Budorgis: Omnibus o bona pax gaudia" (Also SWV338:2 with alternative ecclesiastic text: Adveniunt pascha pleno concelebranda triumpho )

Ich beschwöre euch (1638) 
Leipzig, 1641
 SWV 339 — Ich beschwöre euch, ihr Töchter zu Jerusalem (Dialogus)

O du allersüßester und liebster Herr Jesu 
Leipzig, 1646
 SWV 340 — O du allersüßester und liebster Herr Jesu

Symphoniae sacrae II 
Opus 10: Dresden (1647)

 SWV 341 — Mein Herz ist bereit, Gott, mein Herz ist bereit
 SWV 342 — Singet dem Herren ein neues Lied
 SWV 343 — Herr, unser Herrscher, wie herrlich ist dein Nam
 SWV 344 — Meine Seele erhebt den Herren
 SWV 345 — Der Herr ist meine Stärke
 SWV 346 — Ich werde nicht sterben
 SWV 347 — Ich danke dir, Herr, von ganzem Herzen
 SWV 348 — Herzlich lieb hab ich dich, o Herr on Schalling's hymn
 SWV 349 — Frohlocket mit Händen
 SWV 350 — Lobet den Herrn in seinem Heiligtum
 SWV 351 — Hütet euch, daß eure Herzen nicht beschweret werden
 SWV 352 — Herr, nun lässest du deinen Diener im Friede fahren
 SWV 353 — Was betrübst du dich, meine Seele
 SWV 354 — Verleih uns Frieden genädiglich
 SWV 355 — Gib unsern Fürsten und aller Obrigkeit
 SWV 356 — Es steh Gott auf
 SWV 357 — Wie ein Rubin in feinem Golde leuchtet
 SWV 358 — Iß dein Brot mit Freuden
 SWV 359 — Der Herr ist mein Licht und mein Heil
 SWV 360 — Zweierlei bitte ich, von dir, Herr
 SWV 361 — Herr, neige deine Himmel und fahr herab
 SWV 362 — Von Aufgang der Sonnen
 SWV 363 — Lobet den Herrn, alle Heiden
 SWV 364 — Die so ihr den Herren fürchtet
 SWV 365 — Drei schöne Dinge seind
 SWV 366 — Von Gott will ich nicht lassen
 SWV 367 — Freuet euch des Herren, ihr Gerechten

Aria: Danklied 
 SWV 368 — Fürstliche Gnade zu Wasser und zu Lande 1647 Danck-Lied. Für die hocherwiesene Fürstl. Gnade in Weimar. Text: Christian Timotheus Dufft, for the birthday of Eleonora wife of Wilhelm IV. of Sachsen-Weimar (1598-1662); accompanying ballet is lost.

Geistliche Chormusik

Opus 11: Dresden (1648)

 SWV 369 — Es wird das Scepter von Juda nicht entwendet werden
 SWV 370 — Er wird sein Kleid in Wein waschen
 SWV 371 — Es ist erschienen die heilsame Gnade Gottes allen Menschen
 SWV 372 — Verleih uns Frieden genädiglich
 SWV 373 — Gib unserm Fürsten und aller Obrigkeit
 SWV 374 — Unser keiner lebet sich selber
 SWV 375 — Viel werden kommen von Morgen und von Abend
 SWV 376 — Sammelt zuvor das Unkraut
 SWV 377 — Herr, auf dich traue ich
 SWV 378 — Die mit Tränen säen werden mit Freuden ernten
 SWV 379 — So fahr ich hin zu Jesu Christ
 SWV 380 — Also hat Gott die Welt geliebt
 SWV 381 — O lieber Herre Gott
 SWV 382 — Tröstet, tröstet mein Volk
 SWV 383 — Ich bin eine rufende Stimme
 SWV 384 — Ein Kind ist uns geboren
 SWV 385 — Das Wort ward Fleisch
 SWV 386 — Die Himmel erzählen die Ehre Gottes
 SWV 387 — Herzlich lieb hab ich dich, o Herr
 SWV 388 — Das ist je gewißlich wahr
 SWV 389 — Ich bin ein rechter Weinstock
 SWV 390 — Unser Wandel ist im Himmel
 SWV 391 — Selig sind die Toten
 SWV 392 — Was mein Gott will, das g'scheh allzeit
 SWV 393 — Ich weiß, daß mein Erlöser lebt
 SWV 394 — Sehet an den Feigenbaum
 SWV 395 — Der Engel sprach zu den Hirten
 SWV 396 — Auf dem Gebirge hat man ein Geschrei gehöret
 SWV 397 — Du Schalksknecht

Symphoniae sacrae III 
Opus 12: Dresden (1650)

 SWV 398 — Der Herr ist mein Hirt, S, A, T, 2 vn, compl. 4vv and insts ad lib, bc
 SWV 399 — Ich hebe meine Augen auf, A, T, B, 2 vn, compl. 4vv and insts ad lib, bc
 SWV 400 — Wo der Herr nicht das Haus bauet, 2 S, B, vn, cornettino/vn, compl. 4vv and insts ad lib, bc
 SWV 401 — Mein Sohn, warum hast du uns das getan (in dialogo), S, Mez, B, 2 vn, compl. 4vv and insts ad lib, bc
 SWV 402 — O Herr hilf, 2 S, T, 2 vn, bc
 SWV 403 — Siehe, es erschien der Engel des Herren, S, 2 T, B, 2 vn, compl. 4vv and insts ad lib, bc
 SWV 404 — Feget den alten Sauerteig aus, S, A, T, B, 2 vn, bc
 SWV 405 — O süsser Jesu Christ, 2 S, A, T, 2 vn, compl. 4vv and insts ad lib, bc
 SWV 406 — O Jesu süss, wer dein gedenkt (super Lilia convallium, Alexandri Grandis), 2 S, 2 T, 2 vn, bc
 SWV 407 — Lasset uns doch den Herren, unsern Gott, loben, 2 S, T, B, 2 vn, compl. 4vv and insts ad lib, bc
 SWV 408 — Es ging ein Sämann aus zu säen, S, A, T, B, 2 vn, bn, compl. 4vv and insts ad lib, bc
 SWV 409 — Seid barmherzig, S, A, T, B, 2 vn, bn (+ B), compl. 4vv and insts ad lib, bc
 SWV 410 — Siehe, dieser wird gesetzt zu einem Fall, 2 S, A, T, B, 2 vn, bc
 SWV 411 — Vater unser, der du bist im Himmel, S, Mez, 2 T, B, 2 vn, compl. 4vv and insts ad lib, bc
 SWV 412 — Siehe, wie fein und lieblich ist, 2 S, A, T, B, 2 vn, bn, compl. 2 insts ad lib, bc
 SWV 413 — Hütet euch, dass eure Herzen, 2 S, A, 2 T, B, 2 vn, bc
 SWV 414 — Meister, wir wissen, dass du wahrhaftig bist, 2 S, A, T, B, 2 vn, bn, compl. 4vv and insts ad lib, bc
 SWV 415 — Saul, Saul, was verfolgst du mich, 2 S, A, T, 2 B, 2 vn, 2 cap. S, A, T, B ad lib, bc
 SWV 416 — Herr, wie lang willt du mein so gar vergessen, 2 S, A, 2 T, B, 2 vn, compl. 4 viole ad lib, bc
 SWV 417 — Komm, heiliger Geist, S, Mez, 2 T, Bar, B, 2 vn, 2 cap. S, A, T, B ad lib, bc
 SWV 418 — Nun danket alle Gott, 2 S, A, 2 T, B, 2 vn, compl. 4vv and insts ad lib, bc

Trauerlied 
Dresden (1652)
 SWV 419 — O meine Seel, warum bist du betrübet (Trauer-Lied), S, A, T, B, on death of Anna Margaretha Brehme, wife of the court librarian, Dresden, 21 Sept 1652

Zwölf geistliche Gesänge 
Opus 13: Dresden (1657)

 SWV 420 — Kyrie, Gott Vater in Ewigkeit (super Missam Fons bonitatis), S, A, T, B, bc
 SWV 421 — All Ehr und Lob soll Gottes sein (Das teutsche Gloria in excelsis), S, A, T, B, bc
 SWV 422 — Ich gläube an einen einigen Gott (Der nicänische Glaube), S, A, T, B, bc
 SWV 423 — Unser Herr Jesus Christus, in der Nacht (Die Wort der Einsetzung des heiligen Abendmahls), 2 S, A, B, bc
 SWV 424 — Ich danke dem Herrn von ganzem Herzen (Der 111. Psalm), 2 S, A, B, bc
 SWV 425 — Danksagen wir alle Gott, 2 S, A, T, bc
 SWV 426 — Meine Seele erhebt den Herren (Magnificat), S, A, T, B, bc
 SWV 427 — O süsser Jesu Christ (Des H. Bernhardi Freudengesang), 2 S, A, B; I: 2 S, A, B; II: 2 S, A, B; bc
 SWV 428 — Kyrie eleison, Christe eleison (Die teutsche gemeine Litaney), S, A, T, B, bc
 SWV 429 — Aller Augen warten auf dich (Das Benedicite vor dem Essen), S, A, T, B, bc
 SWV 430 — Danket dem Herren, denn er ist freundlich (Das Gratias nach dem Essen), S, A, T, B, bc
 SWV 431 — Christe fac ut sapiam (Hymnus pro vera sapientia), S, A, T, B; I: S, A, T, B; II: S, A, T, B; bc

Ceremonial works 
 SWV 432 — 433 - Herr, nun lässest du deinen Diener, Canticum B. Simeonis … nach dem hochseligsten Hintritt … Johann Georgen (Dresden, 1657), on the death of John George I, Elector of Saxony, Dresden, 8 Oct 1657
 SWV 434 — Wie wenn der Adler sich aus seiner Klippe schwingt, S, bc, on the engagement of Princess Magdalena Sibylla of Saxony and Frederick William II, Duke of Saxe-Altenburg, Dresden, 1651

Weihnachtshistorie 

Dresden (1664)
 SWV 435 — Christmas Story: "Die Geburt unsers Herren Jesu Christi, Historia, der freuden- und gnadenreichen Geburt Gottes und Marien Sohnes, Jesu Christi".

Miscellaneous works 

 SWV 436 — Ego autem sum, [B], bc
 SWV 437 — Veni, Domine, [S], bc
 SWV 438 — Die Erde trinkt für sich (Madrigal) (Optiz), A, T, bc
 SWV 439 — Heute ist Christus der Herr geboren, 3 S, bc
 SWV 440 — Güldne Haare, gleich Aurore (Canzonetta), 2 S, 2 vn
 SWV 441 — Liebster, sagt in süssem Schmerzen (Opitz), 2 S, 2 vn, bc
 SWV 442 — Tugend ist der beste Freund (Opitz), 2 S, 2 vn, bc,
 SWV 443 — Weib, was weinest du (Dialogo per la pascua), 2 S, A, T, bc
 SWV 444 — Es gingen zweene Menschen hinauf (in dialogo), 2 S, A, Bar, bc
 SWV 445 — Ach bleib mit deiner Gnade, doub.
 SWV 446 — In dich hab ich gehoffet, Herr, doub.
 SWV 447 — Erbarm dich mein, o Herre Gott, S, 2 viole/vn, 2 viole, vle, bc
 SWV 448 — Gelobet seist du, Herr (Gesang der dreyer Menner im feurig Ofen), 2 S, A, T, B, 2 cornettinos ad lib, 3 trombones ad lib, [cap. 2 S, A, T, B ad lib], cap. 2 vn, 2 viole, vle ad lib, bc
 SWV 449 — Herr, unser Herrscher (Psalmus 8), 2 S, A, T, B (+ cap. ad lib), cornettino/vn ad lib, vn/cornett ad lib, 4 trombones ad lib, bc (org, vle)
 SWV 450 — Ach Herr, du Schöpfer aller Ding (Madrigale spirituale), S, A, 2 T, B, bc
 SWV 451 — Nachdem ich lag in meinem öden Bette (Opitz), S, B, 2 vn, 2 insts, bc
 SWV 452 — Lässt Salomon sein Bette nicht umgeben (Opitz), S, B, 2 vn, 2 insts, bc
 SWV 453 — Freue dich des Weibes deiner Jugend, S, A, T, B (+ tutti [ad lib]), tpt, cornett, 3 trombones ad lib, bc
 SWV 454 — Nun lasst uns Gott dem Herren, doub.
 SWV 455 — Die Himmel erzählen die Ehre Gottes (Psalmus 19), 2 S, A, 2 T, B (+ cap. ad lib), bc
 SWV 456 — Hodie Christus natus est, 2 S, A, 2 T, B, bc
 SWV 457 — Ich weiss, dass mein Erlöser lebet, 2 S, A, 2 T, B
 SWV 458 — Kyrie eleison, Christe eleison (Litania), 2 S, A, 2 T, B, bc
 SWV 459 — Saget den Gästen, S, A, T, B, 2 vn, bn, bc
 SWV 460 — Itzt blicken durch des Himmels Saal (Madrigal) (Opitz), 2 S, A, T, B, 2 vn, bc
 SWV 461 — Herr, der du bist vormals genädig gewest, 2 S, 2 T, B, 2 vn, 3 trombones ad lib, cap. S, A, T, B ad lib, bc
 SWV 462 — Auf dich, Herr, traue ich (Psalmus 7), I: S, A, T, B; II: S, A, T, B; coro aggiunto (2 vn, viola cornett, 3 trombones), ad lib, bc
 SWV 463 — Cantate Domino canticum novum, Coro I: S, A, T, B; Coro II: S, A, T, B, bc
 SWV 464 — Ich bin die Auferstehung, Coro I: S, A, T, B; Coro II: S, A, T, B - on the death of Anton Colander, before 1620
 SWV 465 — Da pacem Domine, Coro I: 5 viole + 1/2vv; Coro II: S, A, T, B, bc
 SWV 466 — Herr, wer wird wohnen in deiner Hütten (Psalmus 15), Coro I: A, B, 2 vn, vle; Coro II: S, T, 3 trombones, bc
 SWV 467 — Wo Gott der Herr nicht bei uns hält, Coro I: S, lutes; Coro II: S, 3 viols; Coro III: S, 3 trombones, bc, on the hymn "Wo Gott der Herr nicht bei uns hält"
 SWV 468 — Magnificat anima mea, S, A, T, B, 2 vn, 3 trombones, 2 cap. S, A, T, B ad lib, bc
 SWV 469 — Surrexit pastor bonus, 2 S, A, 2 T, B, 2 vn, 3 trombones, 2 cap. S, A, T, B ad lib, bc
 SWV 470 — Christ ist erstanden, S, A, T, 4 viole, 4 trombones, bc
 SWV 471 — O bone Jesu, fili Mariae, 2 S, 2 A, T, B (+ rip. ad lib), 2 vn/viole, 4 viole, bc
 SWV 472 — * "", doub.
 SWV 473 — Wo der Herr nicht das Haus bauet (Psalmus 127), Coro I: 2 S, A, T, B, 2 vn, 3 trombones; Coro II (cap.): S, A, T, B; bc
 SWV 474 — Ach wie soll ich doch in Freuden leben, Coro I: S, lutes; Coro II: S, 3 viole; Coro III: S, 3 trombones; cap. A, T, B, vn, cornett, bc
 SWV 475 — Veni, Sancte Spiritus, Coro I: 2 S, bn; Coro II: B, 2 cornetts; Coro III: 2 T, 3 trombones; Coro IV: A, T, vn, fl, vle; bc
 SWV 476 — Domini est terra, Coro I: S, A, T, B (+ tutti ad lib); Coro II: S, A, T, B (+ tutti ad lib); 2 cornetti, 5 bn, 2 vn, 4 trombones; bc
 SWV 477 — Vater Abraham, erbarme dich mein (Dialogus divites Epulonis cum Abrahamo), 2 S, A, T, B, 2 vn (alternating with 2 fl), vle, bc
 SWV 478 — Die sieben Wortte unsers lieben Erlösers und Seeligmachers Jesu Christi, Da Jesus an dem Kreuze stund, S, A, 2 T, B (+ cap. ad lib),5 insts, bc

Passions 
 SWV 479 — Historia des Leidens und Sterbens unsers Herrn und Heylandes Jesu Christi nach dem Evangelisten S. Matheum, 1666, Das Leiden unsers Herren Jesu Christi, wie es beschreibet der heilige Evangeliste Matthaeus, 2 S, A, 3 T, 2 B, chorus 4vv
 SWV 480 — Historia des Leidens und Sterbens … Jesu Christi nach dem Evangelisten St. Lucam, Das Leiden unsers Herren Jesu Christi, wie uns das beschreibet der heilige Evangeliste Lucas, S, A, 3 T, 2 B, chorus 4vv
 SWV 481 — Historia des Leidens und Sterbens … Jesu Christi nach dem Evangelisten St. Johannem, Das Leiden unsers Herren Jesu Christi, wie uns das beschreibet der heilige Evangeliste Johannes, S, 3 T, 2 B, chorus 4vv

Schwanengesang 
Opus 13 (1671, Dresden) - Opus Ultimum - Schwanengesang

 SWV 482 — Wohl denen, die ohne Wandel leben - Psalm 119 - Aleph & Beth
 SWV 483 — Tue wohl deinem Knechte, dass ich lebe - Psalm 119 - Gimel & Daleth
 SWV 484 — Zeige mir, Herr, den Weg deiner Rechte - Psalm 119 - He & Vav
 SWV 485 — Gedenke deinem Knechte an dein Wort - Psalm 119 - Dsaïn & Vhet
 SWV 486 — Du trust Guts deinem Knechte - Psalm 119 - Thet & Jod
 SWV 487 — Meine Seele verlanget nach deinem Heil - Psalm 119 - Caph & Lamed
 SWV 488 — Wie habe ich deine Gesetze so lieb - Psalm 119 - Mem & Nun
 SWV 489 — Ich hasse die Flattergeister - Psalm 119 - Samech & Ain
 SWV 490 — Deine Zeugnisse sind wunderbarlich - Pe & Zade
 SWV 491 — Ich rufe von ganzem Herzen - Koph & Resch
 SWV 492 — Die Fürsten verfolgen mich ohn Ursach - Schin & Tav
 SWV 493 — Jauchzet dem Herren, alle Welt - Psalm 100
 SWV 494 — Meine Seele erhebt den Herren (Deutsches Magnificat)

Other works 
 SWV 495 — Unser Herr Jesus Christus, in der Nacht, I: S, A, T, B; II: S, A, T, B
 SWV 496 — Esaja, dem Propheten, das geschah, B, 8vv,2 cornetts (alternating with 2 rec), 7vv, bc
 SWV 497 — Ein Kind ist uns geboren, 2 T, bc
 SWV 498 — Stehe auf; meine Freundin, I: S, A, T, B; II: S, A, T, B
 SWV 499 — Tulerunt Dominum meum, et nescio ubi posuerunt eum, (Mary Magdalene) 4 tpt, 20 parts, bc
 SWV 500 — An den Wassern zu Babel (Psalm 137), I: T, 4 trombones; II: 2 S, B; bc
 SWV 501 — Mit dem Amphion zwar mein Orgel und mein Harfe (Klag-Lied), T, bc, on death of Magdalena Schütz, Dresden, 6 Sept 1625;

Uncatalogued works 
 A1 — Vier Hirtinnen, gleich jung, gleich schon, 2 S, A, T, bc
 A2 — Ach Herr, du Sohn David, doub.
 A3 — Der Gott Abraham, doub.
 A4 — Stehe auf, meine Freundin, doub.
 A5 — Benedicam Dominum in omni tempore, doub.
 A6 — Freuet euch mit mir, doub.
 A7 — Herr, höre mein Wort, doub.
 A8 — Machet die Tore weit, doub.
 A9 — Sumite psalmum, doub.
 A10 — Dominus illuminatio mea, doub.
 A11 — Es erhub sich ein Streit, doub.

Lost works 

Dafne (Torgau, 1627) — the first German opera, where Schütz put music to a German adaptation (by Martin Opitz) of the original opera by Ottavio Rinuccini.
Orpheus und Eurydike (Dresden, 1638) — a ballet based on the myth about Orpheus and Eurydice, with libretto by August Buchner.
Paris und Helena five-act Sing-Ballet to a libretto by David Schirmer. For the double wedding in Dresden of the brothers Maurice, Duke of Saxe-Zeitz and Christian I, Duke of Saxe-Merseburg.

References

External links
heinrich-schuetz-haus.de
hoasm.org
cpdl.org
collegium.or.jp
klassika.info

Schutz, Heinrich